Eric Michael Hilton (July 1, 1933 – December 10, 2016) was an American heir, hotelier, and philanthropist.

Early life
Eric Hilton was born on July 1, 1933 in Dallas, Texas. He was the third son of Conrad Hilton (the founder of the Hilton Hotels Corporation.) and his first wife Mary Adelaide Barron. 

Growing up in El Paso, Texas, Hilton was educated at El Paso High School and graduated from Texas Western College. He served as a radar specialist in the Army in the Korean War.

Career
Hilton started his career at the Hilton Hotels Corporation in 1949. He first worked at the El Paso Hilton, working his way up from "bellman, doorman, steward, cook, elevator operator, desk clerk and telephone operator." Within a decade, in 1959, he became the manager of the Deshler Hilton in Columbus, Ohio. Two years later, in 1961, he became the manager of the Shamrock Hilton in Houston, Texas. He later served as the corporation's executive vice president. He also served on its board of directors. He served as its vice chairman from 1993 to 1997, when he retired.

Philanthropy
Hilton served as the chairman of the BEST Foundation for a Drug-Free Tomorrow. He also served on the board of directors of the Little League Foundation of America from 1977 to 2016 Additionally, he served on the board of trustees of the Conrad N. Hilton Foundation.

Hilton founded the Nevada Medical Center. He also founded the Three Square Food Bank, a food bank in Clark County, Nevada, in 2007. By 2016, the food bank had spread to Lincoln County, Nye County and Esmeralda County.

An on campus restaurant in honor of Eric Hilton, Eric's is part of the Hilton College of Hotel and Restaurant Management. Students of the Hilton College run all aspects and operations of the restaurant and bar. 

Hilton received the Award of Merit from the American Vocational Association as well as the Alumni President's Award and an honorary Doctor of Humane Letters degree from the University of Houston.

Personal life and death
Hilton married his wife, Patricia Ann Skipworth, when they were just 19 years old. They had four children: Eric M. Hilton, Jr., Beverly Hilton-Neapolitan, Linda Hilton, Joseph Bradley Hilton. They raised their children in a residence in Houston, Texas. Eric and Patricia later divorced. 
 
Eric Hilton died on December 10, 2016, aged 83 with his 4 loving children by his bedside. Hilton's  wife, Patricia, died the following May also at the age of 83, a private ceremony was held at their Katy, Texas home.

References

1933 births
2016 deaths
People from Dallas
People from El Paso, Texas
University of Texas at El Paso alumni
United States Army personnel of the Korean War
Businesspeople from Las Vegas
American corporate directors
Philanthropists from Nevada
Conrad Hilton family
Philanthropists from Texas